Welcome to Jamrock is the third studio album by Reggae/Dancehall artist Damian "Jr. Gong" Marley. The album was released on September 12, 2005, in the United Kingdom and September 13, 2005, in the United States.

Marley won two 2006 Grammy Awards for the album, Best Reggae Album and Best Urban/Alternative Performance (for the track "Welcome to Jamrock"). Guests on the album include Stephen Marley, Black Thought, Bobby Brown and Nas. The executive producers of the album were Stephen Marley and Damian "Jr. Gong" Marley.

Recording
Production of the album was handled by Damian and his brother Stephen Marley, the pair had frequently collaborated with Damian wanting to utilise the professionals already in his family. The album's title track was inspired by the side of Jamaica that the world doesn't see and the media doesn't show, it was inspired by the everyday citizens. The title was a play on from a song entitled "Welcome to Atlanta", which discussed the dark side of Atlanta. Inspired by this Marley wanted showcase what it was like to live in a "third world country."

Reception

Chart performance

The album debuted at number 7 on the Billboard 200, and sold 86,000 copies, during its first week of release in the United States. As of August 23, 2006, Welcome to Jamrock has sold 539,000 recognized copies in the United States. Between September 2005 and 2007, the album spent more than 30  weeks at the top of the Billboard Reggae Albums chart.<ref name="Jackson2201">Jackson, Kevin (2022) "'Jamrock' back on charts", Jamaica Observer, 21 January 2022. Retrieved 29 January 2022</ref> In January 2022, it re-entered the chart at number 10.

The title-track peaked at number 55 in the US on the Billboard Hot 100, but did better on the R&B and rap charts, peaking at numbers 18 and 12, respectively. It also did well in the UK, peaking at number 13.

Critical reception
Steve Yates, in The Observer, gave the album five stars out of five, concluding that "Like his father, Damian is tucked in well behind the cutting edge of digital production, but this fine collection of songs outshines the ephemeral delights of modern day dancehall. The Jr Gong is banging. Get it on."

David Jeffries, writing for AllMusic, gave the album four stars out of five, saying "Besides the fantastic single, this album has 'legs,' with a bulging lyric sheet filled with vivid and crafty lines that offer plenty to focus on once all the sonic brilliance has sunk in. A career-defining moment that lives up to a huge hit, Welcome to Jamrock'' is a tremendous achievement."

Track listing
All tracks are produced by Stephen Marley and Damian Marley, except where noted.

Personnel
Credits adapted from AllMusic.

Chris Athens	– Mastering
Cristy Barber	– A&R
Black Thought	– Guest Artist, Primary Artist
Bounty Killer	– Guest Artist, Primary Artist
Bobby Brown	– Guest Artist, Primary Artist
Errol Brown	– Mixing
Jill Capone	– Product Manager
James "Bonzai" Caruso	– Engineer, Keyboards, Mixing
Commissioner Gordon	– Mixing
Shiah Coore	– Bass, Keyboards
Gary Corbett	– Keyboards
Noel Davey	– Hammond organ, Piano
Sean Diedrick	– Keyboards
Eek-A-Mouse	– Guest Artist, Primary Artist
Paul Fakhourie	– Bass, Clavinet, Keyboards
Dean Fraser	– Saxophone
Rovleta Fraser	– Primary Artist, Backing vocals
Deron D. James	– Cover Design
Jazzwad	– Bass, Drum Programming, Drums, Keyboards
Joanne "Joey" Joseph	– A&R
King Swamp	– Vocals
Kevin Law	– A&R
Marc Stephen Lee	– Engineer
Bob Marley	– Composer
Damian Marley	– Composer, Drum Programming, Executive Producer, Keyboards, Primary Artist, Producer
Julian Marley	– Hammond organ
Stephen Marley	– Bass, Composer, Executive Producer, Guitar, Keyboards, Percussion, Primary Artist, Producer, Synthesizer
Roland McDermott	– Engineer
Gregory J. Morris	– Engineer
Nas	– Guest Artist, Primary Artist
Stephen "Asher" Noel	– Bass, Guitar
Alfredo Oliva	– Concertmaster
R. Price	– Composer
Ras Kass	– Concept Graphics
Don Reid	– A&R
Owen "Dreadie" Reid	– Bass
The Roots	– Guest Artist
Kenneth Roxborough	– Backing vocals
R. Russell	– Composer
Keith Tamashiro	– Art Direction
Craig "Niteman" Taylor	– Drum Fills, Drums
Franklin Thompson	– Backing vocals
Uziah "Sticky" Thompson	– Percussion
Dan Warner	– Guitar
Larry Warrilow	– String Arrangements
Roselyn Williams – Backing vocals

Samples
"Confrontation" contains spoken-word samples from speeches made by Haile Selassie I and Marcus Garvey. The music is a sample of the entrance music of former WCW wrestler Bill Goldberg.
"Road to Zion" contains a sample from "Russian Lullaby" by Ella Fitzgerald
"Move!" contains a sample from "Exodus" by Bob Marley & The Wailers
"Welcome to Jamrock" contains a sample from "World a Music" by Ini Kamoze
"The Master Has Come Back" contains a sample from "Bide Up" by Bunny Wailer.
"All Night" contains the sample from "Nimrod" by The Skatalites.
"There for You" contains a sample from "Heartbreak Hotel" by the Jacksons.
"Khaki Suit" contains a sample from "For Hire and Removal" by Eek-A-Mouse .

Charts

Weekly charts

Year-end charts

Certifications

References

External links
Official website
Planet Jamrock, Jamrock's Home Online

2005 albums
Damian Marley albums
Universal Records albums
Grammy Award for Best Reggae Album